Sector 57 is a 1980 role-playing game supplement published by Detroit Gaming Center.

Contents
Sector 57 features a scenario in which two astronauts will need to deactivate a well-guarded alien structure to prevent a massive explosion.

Publication history
Erick Wujcik published the science-fiction adventure Sector 57 (1980) under the banner of the Detroit Gaming Center, of which he was the Director.

Reception
Jerry Epperson reviewed Sector 57 in The Space Gamer No. 33. Epperson commented that "This is an excellently produced and conceived adventure, and praise goes to Erick Wujick for a job well done. The only flaw is the fact that if the characters fail to complete their mission, they are dead. Some people will not appreciate that."

References

Role-playing game supplements introduced in 1980
Science fiction role-playing game supplements